Melina Schuh is a German molecular biologist. She is known for her work on meiosis in human egg cells, and for her studies on the mechanisms that lead to Down syndrome.

Early life and education 
Schuh was born in 1980 in Germany and grew up in Bad Pyrmont. She received a diploma degree in biochemistry from the University of Bayreuth, Germany. She went on to do her PhD with Jan Ellenberg at the European Molecular Biology Laboratory (EMBL) in Heidelberg, Germany, where she used live cell imaging to study the organization of the spindle in mouse oocytes.

Career 
In 2009, Schuh became a group leader at the MRC Laboratory of Molecular Biology in Cambridge, UK. Her work centers around the process of asymmetric oocyte division, in which oocytes mature into eggs by extruding half of their chromosomes in a small cell termed the polar body. This requires the spindle apparatus in these cells to be asymmetric. She discovered a role for proteins that control actin nucleation in the positioning of the spindle. In studying how actin helps position the spindle, she discovered that vesicles carrying specific signals can change the organization and density of actin networks.

Errors in oocyte division can lead to genetic disorders such as Down syndrome. Working with Bourn Hall Clinic, the clinic that first pioneered IVF, Schuh studied human oocyte divisions directly, instead of using mouse oocytes as a model system. She found that human oocytes have a surprisingly slow and error-prone mechanism for assembling the meiotic spindle, increasing the likelihood of segregation errors. She has also investigated the reasons why the children of older mothers have a higher rate of pregnancy loss and Down syndrome, finding that oocytes from older mothers have a higher frequency of errors in pairing between sister chromatids. Schuh has shown that actin filaments normally protect mammalian eggs against this type of error.

Awards
 2012 : EMBO Young Investigator
 2013 : ERC Starting Grant
 2014 : Lister Institute Research Prize
 2014 : Biochemical Society Early Career Award 
 2015 : John Kendrew Young Scientist Award 
 2018 : EMBO Gold Medal
 2019 : Colworth Medal, Biochemical Society 
 2019 : Gottfried Wilhelm Leibniz Prize
 2019 : Member of the German Academy of Sciences Leopoldina

References

21st-century German biologists
Living people
University of Bayreuth alumni
Year of birth missing (living people)
21st-century German women scientists
German women biologists
Members of the German Academy of Sciences Leopoldina
Max Planck Institute directors